Dahmer vs. Gacy is a 2010 American comedy horror film directed by Ford Austin and written by Andrew J. Rausch. The film won the Audience Award at the 2010 Bare Bones International Film Festival.

Plot
A secret government lab run by Dr. Stravinsky has been trying to create the ultimate killer using the DNA of infamous serial killers Jeffrey Dahmer and John Wayne Gacy. However, the two escape, and go on a killing spree across the United States. Trying to stop the maniacs is Ringo, a hick warrior being trained by God and armed with a shotgun and a bottle of whiskey; along with his own demons, Ringo faces an army of Japanese ninjas and a super serial killer.

Cast

Production

Filming
Parts of the film were shot in Toluca Lake, Echo Park and Hollywood, Los Angeles.

Soundtrack
 Enuff Z'Nuff — "Roll Me"
 Enuff Z'Nuff — "Can't Wait"
 The Seventh Triangle — "Dead End Job"
 Enuff Z'Nuff — "You & I"
 Jason Peri — "Honey Bee"
 Enuff Z'Nuff — "Everything Works If You Let It"
 Enuff Z'Nuff — "Rock 'n World"
 Enuff Z'Nuff — "Z'overture"
 Enuff Z'Nuff — "Wheels"

Reception

Tony Vilgotsky of Darker rated the movie highly, adding that the plot should not be taken seriously.

References

External links
 

2010 films
American comedy horror films
Films set in California
Films set in Los Angeles
American independent films
Films about Jeffrey Dahmer
Films about John Wayne Gacy
Cultural depictions of Charles Manson
2010s English-language films
2010s American films